P. Mallavaram (Polekurru Mallavaram) is a village in Thallarevu mandal, located in East Godavari district of the Indian state of Andhra Pradesh.

References

Villages in East Godavari district